For railway stations in Hong Kong, see:
List of MTR stations

Hong Kong Disneyland Railroad
Ocean Express
Conventional railway shares tracks with the East Rail line, a regional/suburban service integrated within the MTR network. Currently cross-border trains only stop at Hung Hom station in Kowloon. The West Rail line was also built to conventional railway standard but currently only regional/suburban service is available.

See also: :Category:Defunct railway stations in Hong Kong

External links

Railway stations
Hong Kong